LCCS may refer to:

 Lake Center Christian School, located in Hartville, northwest Stark county, in northeast Ohio
 Land cover classification system, a classification system for the earth's surface and especially its land use
 Lethal congenital contracture syndrome, a rare genetic disorder
 Lincoln Christian College and Seminary, now called Lincoln Christian University, located in Illinois